John McBain (born April 23, 1965) is an American musician, producer, and mastering engineer from New Jersey. He was guitarist for Monster Magnet, Hater, and Wellwater Conspiracy, among others. He is also active as a solo artist and has contributed to The Desert Sessions.

Career

Hater
After leaving Monster Magnet, McBain moved to Washington State to create the garage rock group Hater, along with Matt Cameron (Soundgarden, Pearl Jam), Ben Shepherd (Soundgarden) and Brian Wood (brother of Mother Love Bone vocalist Andrew Wood). The band released two albums of their brand of garage/psychedelic rock: their self-titled debut in 1993 and their follow-up, The 2nd, which was recorded in 1995 but released in 2005.

In 1997, after Hater broke up, McBain participated in the first Desert Sessions, a musical project led by Queens of the Stone Age frontman Josh Homme. There he befriended ex-Kyuss/Fu Manchu drummer Brant Bjork.

He was a live member of the Queens of the Stone Age for their first three shows, and co-wrote the song "Regular John" which appears on their self-titled debut album.

Wellwater Conspiracy
In 1997, McBain and Matt Cameron created the Wellwater Conspiracy along with Ben Shepherd. Their debut release was Declaration of Conformity, released in 1997 on the Third Gear label. Shortly after the release, Cameron was chosen to replace Jack Irons as drummer for rock group Pearl Jam. However, Cameron maintained both groups, contributing to a further three Wellwater Conspiracy albums. Notable appearances include keyboardist Glenn Slater of folk rock group The Walkabouts, Eddie Vedder of Pearl Jam and Josh Homme of Queens of the Stone Age and Kyuss.

Solo career
In 2004, McBain moved to San Francisco, refining material that he had accumulated which he believed was not in step with the Wellwater Conspiracy's garage rock style. In February 2006 he released The In-Flight Feature on Duna Records (founded by Brant Bjork). In 2012 McBain collaborated with Carlton Melton on their Smoke Drip 12 inch LP

Discography

With Monster Magnet
 Monster Magnet – 1990 (EP)
 Tab – 1991 (EP)
 Spine of God – 1991

With Hater
 Hater – 1993
 The 2nd – 2005

With Devilhead
 Pest Control – 1996

With Wellwater Conspiracy
 Declaration of Conformity – 1997
 Brotherhood of Electric: Operational Directives – 1999
 The Scroll and Its Combinations – 2001
 Wellwater Conspiracy – 2003

Solo work
 The In-Flight Feature – 2006
 Accidental Soundtracks Vol. 1: The Alpha Particle – 2017

Other contributions
 Desert Sessions Vol 1 & 2 – 1998
 Desert Sessions Vol 3 & 4 – 1998
 The Freeks – The Freeks – 2008
 Carlton Melton – Smoke Drip – 2012

References

1965 births
Living people
Monster Magnet members
Guitarists from New Jersey
American male guitarists
20th-century American guitarists
Wellwater Conspiracy members
20th-century American male musicians
Hater (band) members